Alan Clyne (born 25 July 1986 in Inverness) is a professional squash player from Scotland. As of 2021 he is ranked at No. 38 in the world. He has won the Scottish National title ten times. He represented his country in the 2010 Commonwealth Games in both singles and doubles, and is the current Scottish number one, following in the footsteps of greats such as Peter Nicol and John White.

References

External links 
 
 
 
 

1986 births
Living people
Scottish male squash players
Commonwealth Games competitors for Scotland
Squash players at the 2010 Commonwealth Games
Squash players at the 2014 Commonwealth Games
Squash players at the 2018 Commonwealth Games
Sportspeople from Inverness